Chilly may refer to:

Cold, i.e. low (or lower) temperature

Entertainment
 Chilly (band), a 1970s German Euro disco/rock band
 Chilly McStuffins, a hypochondriac snowman in the American-Irish animated children's television series, Doc McStuffins
 Chilly Willy, a diminutive anthropomorphic penguin in the American animated children's television series, Woody Woodpecker
 Chilly Willy (wrestler) (born 1969), ring name of American professional wrestler William Jones

Food
Chiefly India: chili pepper, the spicy fruit of plants in the genus Capsicum
Chiefly British: chili powder, dried, ground red chile peppers, sometimes with cumin and other spices
Chiefly British: chili con carne, a stew-like dish in Mexican and Tex-Mex cuisine, (usually called "chili" in North American English)
Chilly Cow, a brand of ice cream

Places

France
 Chilly, Ardennes, in the Ardennes département
 Chilly, Haute-Savoie, in the Haute-Savoie département
 Chilly, Somme, in the Somme département
 Chilly-le-Vignoble, in the Jura département
 Chilly-Mazarin, in the Essonne département
 Chilly-sur-Salins, in the Jura département

Elsewhere
 Chilly, Idaho, a community in the United States

See also
Chile (disambiguation)
Chili (disambiguation)